Ferapontovo is a village in Kirillovsky District, Vologda Oblast, Russia. The Ferapontov Monastery is located in the village.

References 

Rural localities in Kirillovsky District